Daiane Menezes Rodrigues (born 15 April 1983), commonly known as Bagé, is a Brazilian former footballer. She played as a defender for various Brazilian clubs and for the Brazil national team.

Club career
Bagé was born in Bagé, Rio Grande do Sul. She began playing indoor football for a local team called Celeste, and was then scouted by Grêmio. At Grêmio she was converted from a defensive midfielder to a central defender, where she remained for the rest of her career. In 2003 she moved to São Bernardo at the suggestion of her youth international teammate Cristiane.

In January 2010 Bagé left Botucatu, where she had won the 2006 Taça Brasil, for São José. She played for São José in the 2014 International Women's Club Championship, featuring in the Brazilian club's 2–0 final win over English wild card entrant Arsenal.

The later part of Bagé's career was disrupted by knee injuries: an anterior cruciate ligament injury to her right knee in July 2013, followed by an identical injury in the left knee in April 2017 and a torn knee cartilage in October 2018. She left São José in January 2021.

International career

Youth
Bagé played for Brazil at the 2002 FIFA U-20 Women's World Championship.

Senior

In November 2006 Bagé made her senior international debut in Brazil's 6–0 South American Women's Football Championship win over Venezuela at Estadio José María Minella, Mar del Plata.

Bagé was recalled to the national team just before the 2011 FIFA Women's World Cup, where she played as a sweeper alongside Aline and Érika in a back three. In Brazil's quarterfinal defeat by the United States, Bagé scored a second-minute own goal and had the only missed attempt for either team in the penalty shootout. Nevertheless she retained the support of her teammates.

In January 2012 Bagé was appointed to the captaincy of the national team, and described as "a born leader" by the coach Jorge Barcellos. At the beginning of the 2012 Summer Olympics tournament in London, she had 28 caps for the national team.

Personal life
Bagé and her São José teammate Priscilinha had a side job selling ice cream at the Estádio Martins Pereira in 2012. In 2013 the duo also opened a car wash business. In 2014 Bagé was criticised for appearing in promotional materials for the fraudulent internet phone service company Telexfree.

Notes

References

External links

1983 births
Living people
Brazilian women's footballers
People from Bagé
Women's association football defenders
2007 FIFA Women's World Cup players
2011 FIFA Women's World Cup players
Footballers at the 2011 Pan American Games
Olympic footballers of Brazil
Footballers at the 2012 Summer Olympics
Brazil women's international footballers
Pan American Games gold medalists for Brazil
Pan American Games silver medalists for Brazil
Pan American Games medalists in football
Botucatu Futebol Clube players
Universiade bronze medalists for Brazil
Universiade medalists in football
Medalists at the 2011 Summer Universiade
Medalists at the 2011 Pan American Games
Sportspeople from Rio Grande do Sul
Grêmio Foot-Ball Porto Alegrense (women) players